The Hessian Skittles are a group of nine extinct volcanoes in the northwestern and lowest part of the Rhön Mountains in East Hesse, Germany. This striking collection of domed hills or kuppen is located in the counties of Hersfeld-Rotenburg and Fulda in the northwestern part of the Kuppen Rhön east of Eiterfeld and south of Schenklengsfeld.

Geology and history 
The heart of these kuppen, that were called the Hessian Skittles thanks to their similar shape and number, consists mainly of hexagonal basalt columns (see also under Stoppelsberg), that were formed as the lava cooled off.

According to legend, the giants had a skittle alley here, using the Stoppelsberg as the bowling ball.

Mountains and hills 

The nine summits of the Hessian Skittles include one mountain, the Soisberg, and eight hills. In order of their height in metres (m) above sea level (NHN), they are:
 Soisberg (629.9 m), with and observation tower, the Soisberg Tower
 Stallberg (552.9 m)
 Appelsberg (531.5 m)
 Rückersberg (524.7 m)
 Kleinberg (521.5 m)
 Wisselsberg (517.8 m)
 Hübelsberg (479.8 m)
 Morsberg (466.4 m)
 Lichtberg (465 m)

The Gehilfersberg (456 m) is not, however one of the skittles, even though it could have been considered due to its location.
In addition, the Stoppelsberg (523.9 m, with the ruins of Hauneck Castle), which is counted as one of the skittles, lies to the west outside the actual Rhön region. This stems from a local mnemonic verse, which did not take the Hübelsberg and Gehilfersberg into consideration:

The sentence is used to remember the names of the various hills that all end in -berg: the Wissels-, Rückers-, Appels-, Stoppels-, Klein-, Mors-, Stall-, Licht- and Soisberg as the nine peaks in the game of skittles.
An alternative, somewhat shorter version runs: Es trägt das kleine Wiesel auf seinem lichten Rücken, durch Moor und Hügel, den Apfel in den Stall. So ist es.

References

Literature 
 Jessica Schäckermann, Martin Krämer: Stallberg – markante Basaltkuppe im Kegelspiel (PDF; 473 kB) Landkreis Fulda, Hessische Verwaltungsstelle Biosphärenreservat Rhön (publ.), 2006
 Pralle, Ludwig: Die Wallfahrtskirche am Gehilfersberg, in: Gemeindevorstand der Gemeinde Rasdorf (Hrsg.): Rasdorf, Beiträge zur Geschichte einer 1200-jährigen Gemeinde, Rasdorf, 1980, pp. 73 ff
 Sturm, Erwin: Rasdorf, Geschichte und Kunst, Seite 72 ff., Fulda, 1971

External links 
 Tour report with photographs: All the Skittles in One Day 
 Website of the Hessian Skittles 

Mountains of Hesse
Mountains and hills of the Rhön
East Hesse
Extinct volcanoes